Greatest Hits is a two-disc compilation from American stand-up comedian and country music singer Rodney Carrington, with its initial release in 2004. The album consists of selections from his three previous Capitol albums (Morning Wood, Nut Sack and Live: C'mon Laugh You Bastards). The first disc contains stand-up sketches, and the second disc contains music. Two new music tracks, "Put Your Clothes Back On" and "Things We Didn't Know" are included on this compilation as well. "Things We Didn't Know" was Carrington's first non-comedy release.

Track listing

Disc 1 – Stand-Up
All content on Disc 1 written by Rodney Carrington.
 "Country Bar - Mechanical Sheep" – 1:20
 "Going to Heaven Drunk" – 1:17
 "Good Woman - 'Lucky'" – :53
 "Wife at Garage Sales" – :50
 "Growing Up Poor - Toughskin Jeans" – 1:26
 "Deer Hunting - Snake Hunting" – 1:46
 "Walmart" – 2:23
 "Booby Trap" – 1:35
 "Baptist Revival" – 1:49
 "People Piss Ya Off" – 1:23
 "Rodney Scared" – 1:22
 "The Weenie Story" – 3:24
 "Chucky Cheese" – 1:26
 "Japanese Restaurants" – 3:15
 "Vacation" – 2:44
 "Hypochondriac" – 6:46
 "Tips on Marriage" – 3:33
 "Helicopter" – 2:13

Disc 2 – Music
All content on Disc 2 written by Rodney Carrington except where noted.
 "All the Reasons" (Rodney Carrington, Barry Martin) – 2:52
 "Don't Look Now" – 1:48
 "That Awful Day" – 1:54
 "Carlos, Man of Love" (Carrington, Bob Hoban) – 1:41
 "It's Too Late" (Carrington, Mark Gross) – 3:43
 "The Night the Bar Closed Down" (Carrington, Gross) – 2:46
 "Letter To My Penis" (Jazz version) – 2:28
 "Titties and Beer" – 1:16
 "In Her Day" – 1:13
 "Gay Factory Worker" – 1:00
 "A Dozen Roses" – 3:27
 "Carlos" – 4:59
 "Morning Wood" – 1:56
 "More of a Man" (Carrington, Hoban, Tim Northern) – 2:40
 "Pickup Truck" (Carrington, Gross) – 1:11
 "Carlos" – :55
 "Grandpa" – :57
 "Sing You Bastards/Burning Sensation" – 2:05
 "Little Things" – 1:21
 "Dancing With a Man" – 2:43
 "Fred" – 2:02
 "Letter To My Penis" (Country version) – 2:01
 "Put Your Clothes Back On" (Carrington, Martin) – 1:59
 "Things We Didn't Know" – 4:25

Charts

Weekly charts

Year-end charts

Certifications

References

Rodney Carrington albums
2004 greatest hits albums
Capitol Records compilation albums